The Eckkopf Tower is a 25-metre-high observation tower on the eponymous Eckkopf (516 m), a major hill in the Palatine Forest of Germany. It has a tubular steel design and was erected in summer 1975 by the  Deidesheim municipality.

The tower had two predecessors. The first was built in 1891 and collapsed in 1920 during a storm. The second, built in 1973, was destroyed by fire. In the vicinity of the tower there is a restaurant.

External links 
 Information at deidesheim.de
 Information at vg-deidesheim.rlp.d

Observation towers in Rhineland-Palatinate
Buildings and structures in the Palatinate Forest